The women's 3 metre springboard, also reported as high diving, was one of four diving events on the Diving at the 1964 Summer Olympics programme.

The competition was split into two phases:

Preliminary round (11 October)
Divers performed five compulsory dives with limited degrees of difficulty and two voluntary dives without limits. The nine divers with the highest scores advanced to the final.
Final (12 October)
Divers performed three voluntary dives without limit of degrees of difficulty. The final ranking was determined by the combined score with the preliminary round.

Results

References

Sources
 
 

Women
1964
1964 in women's diving
Div